Best Leading Actor or Actress is one of the categories at the Edda Awards. It has been given since 1999, annually.

1999-2016 
From 1999 to 2003, 2007 to 2008, and 2010 to 2016, there was one Edda Award to the best actor and other Edda Award to the best actress. No awards were held in 2009.

Winners – Best Actor:

Winners – Best Actress:

2004-2006 
Between 2004 and 2006, one award was given to the best actor/actress.

Winners:

Edda Awards
Film awards for lead actress
Film awards for lead actor